Belden is an unincorporated community in McHenry County, Illinois, United States.

Notes

Unincorporated communities in McHenry County, Illinois
Unincorporated communities in Illinois